Pago may refer to:

Places 
 the Italian name for Pag (island), off the coast of Croatia
 Pag (town), on the island
 Pago (Papua New Guinea), a volcano in Papua New Guinea
 Pago (American Samoa), an ancient volcano in American Samoa
 Pago, a historical community on Pago Bay, Guam
 Pago Bay, on Guam
 Pago River, a river on Guam
 Pago Pago, the territorial capital of American Samoa, on the main island Tutuila
 Pago Pago Harbor in American Samoa
 Pago del Vallo di Lauro, a town and comune in the province of Avellino, Campania, Italy.
 Pago Veiano, a comune in the Province of Benevento in the Italian region Campania

Other uses 
 Pago International, juice manufacturer
 pago, the Chamorro word for Hibiscus tiliaceus

See also 
 Bago, Burma, a regional capital; formerly named Pegu and Hanthawaddy
 Chalan Pago-Ordot, Guam, a municipality
 Vino de Pago, a classification for Spanish wine